Christianity is the most widely professed religion in the Dominican Republic. Historically, Catholicism dominated the religious practices of the country, and as the official religion of the state it receives financial support from the government. In modern times Protestant and non-Christian groups have experienced a population boom.

Christianity

Roman Catholicism

The most professed denomination by far is Roman Catholicism.

Protestantism and other Christian religions

Morgan Foley was the leader of Protestantism for women in the 1800s. During the 1820s, Protestants migrated to the Dominican Republic from the United States. West Indian Protestants arrived on the island late nineteenth and the early twentieth centuries, and by the 1920s, several Protestant organizations were established all throughout the country, which added diversity to the religious representation in the Dominican Republic. Many of the Protestant groups in DR had connections with organizations in  United States including Evangelical groups like Assemblies of God, Dominican Evangelical Church, and the Seventh-day Adventist Church. These groups dominated the Protestant movement in the earlier part of the 20th century, but in the 1960s and 1970s Pentecostal churches saw the most growth. Protestant denominations active in the Dominican Republic now include:

Assembly of God
Church of God
Baptist
Pentecostal
Seventh-day Adventist Church
Church of the Brethren

Other religions include The Church of Jesus Christ of Latter-day Saints (LDS Church) and Jehovah's Witnesses who have had a growing presence in the country.

Missionaries from the Episcopal Church, the LDS Church, the Jehovah's Witnesses, the Seventh-day Adventist church, and various Mennonite churches also travel to the island. Jehovah's Witnesses, specifically, have been known to be migrating (more so during the last decade) to the Dominican Republic where they feel there is a great need for evangelizing their faith.

Afro-Caribbean religions
The Dominican Republic, being a nation with a large population of Haitian migrants was able to preserve some African religions, and aspects of them. Many of the Afro-Caribbean religions in the country are syncretized with Catholicism, but not all to the same extent. Some may only use the image of saints but be completely Africanized in every other aspect, while others may be fully Christian with some African aspects.

21 Divisiones or Dominican Vodou

Dominican Vodou is composed of three divisions, the Indian Division, which refers to Taino entities, the Black Division, whose entities are of African origin, and the White Division, whose entities are of European origin. The Indian Division is one of the main features that distinguishes 21 Divisiones from other forms of Vodou. Dominican Vodou uses a different percussion, a lot of times it is played with Abates or "Tambour de Palo", which are of Kongo origin; along with it a Guira (Scraper) is usually used. The drums are known as Palos and the drummers as Paleros, and when a ceremony in which they are at is usually referred to as a Fiesta de Palo. Dominican Vodou is practiced through a Tcha Tcha lineage ("maraca" – which means rattle – lineage). In Haiti, Vodou has come about and become more popular through another lineage known as the Asson. However, before the Asson, the Tcha Tcha lineage was the prominent lineage in Haiti. Thus the Tcha Tcha lineage is one of the oldest lineages within the Vodou tradition. Las 21 Divisiones is less strict than the Haitian Vodou tradition.   There is less regleman (fixed doctrines or rules) within the Haitian Vodou Tradition. There is no fixed doctrine, defined temples or ceremonies, and it does not have as rigid a structure. This can be seen in the many different ways in which Caballos de Misterios conduct ceremonies and how the spirits mount a person. Dominican Vodou practitioners are often called "Caballos" but they are also known as Papa Bokos and Papa Lwa (both for males) and Mama Mambos and Mama Lwa (both for females). One who has obtained this title has gone through the last and highest level of initiation that can take anywhere between 3 and 9 days and nights as well as have spent a time working for the community.

Haitian Vodou
Haitian Vodou is also practiced on the island. Haitian Vodou is very much influenced by religions from Benin, and to complement it also influenced by the Kongo religions, the Yoruba, Roman Catholicism and a bit by the Tainos. It is very widely practiced in many bateyes (sugar cane communities) all around the country and large Haitian communities along the border.

Congos Del Espiritu Santo
Congos Del Espiritu Santo, also known as Dominican Santeria, is a mix of African religious symbolism and gods with Roman Catholic rituals. It is not as purely African as Vodou, or Cuban Santeria, but it is very easy to spot African influences in every aspect, one just has to notice the name starts with "Congos". For one thing the Kongo deity Kalunga is syncretized with the Holy Spirit. It is said that the holy spirit appeared to the locals of Villa Mella, Mata los Indios with all the instruments of the religion, which include two drums, one called the Palo Major and the other one often called Alcahuete. A canoita, a clave like instrument made out of wood, and along with it Maracas. They often play their music during burial ceremonies, which is undeniably a very African tradition, specifically from the Congo Republic, DR Congo and Angola today, previously known as the kingdom of Kongo.

Others

Dominican Protestants undoubtedly have African aspects to their religion, especially Pentecostals. This can be seen usually in the instruments used in many churches. For example, it is not uncommon to find handmade or imported drums; some of which include Balsie's, Congas, Bongos and Panderos (tambourines). Taino influence can be seeing as well in the use of Guiras to accompany the music. Superficially Pentecostals can cluster very close with more Africanized religions such as Vodou, Candomble, Santeria. Although many of the beliefs are very distinct, the form of worship may be hard to distinguish for onlookers. Because in all of these religions there is spiritual possession, in the case of Pentecostals the Holy spirit, and sometimes much shouting and glossolalia (speaking in tongues), which is universal in the others as well.

Islam and the Baháʼí Faith 
Muslim population in the nation was increased by Middle Eastern settlers, mostly Arabs of Lebanese, Syrian, and Palestinian origin and by Pakistanis and other people from the Indian subcontinent. Brands of Tasawwuf are becoming more and more manifested in the country from native born Dominican Muslims and foreign Muslims who are murids of the Shadhili, Qadiri, and Ba'Alawi Tariqas. Salafis are also an ethnic group of Muslim in  the Dominican Republic.

Dominican Republic also has enough followers of the Baháʼí Faith to have a Bahá’í National Assembly in the country.

Judaism 

The current population of Jews in the Dominican Republic is close to 3,000, with the majority living in the capital, Santo Domingo and others residing in Sosúa, which was founded by Jews after President Rafael Trujillo offered to accept up to 100,000 Jewish refugees in 1938. Both locations have synagogues.

Religious freedom 
The constitution of the Dominican Republic provides for the freedom of religion. Catholicism is the state religion and the Catholic Church receives special privileges, such as subsidies for clergy salaries and the transfer of property to the Church.

Non-Catholic religious groups can register with the government in order to receive tax exemptions and to be allowed to officiate marriages.

Public schools include religious studies classes with curricula that are overseen by the Catholic Church. Parents can choose to have their children skip such classes, and private schools are not required to provide them. Private religious schools may offer their own religious curricula.

See also

 Islam in the Dominican Republic
 Afro-American religion
 The Church of Jesus Christ of Latter-day Saints in the Dominican Republic
 Religion in Latin America

References

 Dominican Republic-International Religious Freedom Report 2005, U.S. Department of State. November 8, 2005. Retrieved July 13, 2006.
 Dominican Republic - Religion U.S. Library of Congress. Retrieved July 13, 2006.
 Malas Vibras En Casa & Como Quitarlas (21 divisiones)
 Zooming Who?